The Socialist Workers Party in Greece (Greek: Σοσιαλιστικό Εργατικό Κόμμα, ΣΕΚ; translit. Sosialistikó Ergatikó Kómma, SEK) is an affiliate of the International Socialist Tendency (IST). It is the second largest organisation in IST after the British Socialist Workers Party.

History
SEK originated among a group of exiled Greek students in London, led by Maria Styllou and Panos Garganas, and a group of Greek students during the occupations of universities against the Greek dictatorship. In the beginning they organised themselves as the Socialist Revolution Organisation (OSE). While in London they developed relations with the International Socialists led by Tony Cliff and were won to the politics of the IST.

In the early 1980s, the OSE developed closer links with the IST, grew fairly rapidly and in 1997 changed their name to the Socialist Workers Party. In 2001 a minority left to form the Internationalist Workers Left (DEA) organisation. SEK publishes a weekly newspaper, Workers Solidarity (Εργατική Αλληλεγγύη), and a bi-monthly magazine, Socialism from Below (Σοσιαλισμός από τα Κάτω).

The SEK is active in a number of organisations, including the Greek "Stop the War Coalition", "United Against Racism and the threat of Fascism".

In the 2006 Greek local elections for Athens-Piraeus Super Prefecture, the SEK supported candidates under the banner "Συμμαχία για την Υπερνομαρχία" (Symmachia gia tin Ypernomarchia = Union for the Super Prefecture) which took 1.32%.

Electoral results and tactics

External links
Official SEK page in Greek
ANTARSYA
Greek Stop the War Coalition

1997 establishments in Greece
Communist parties in Greece
Far-left politics in Greece
International Socialist Tendency
Political parties established in 1997
Trotskyist organizations in Greece